Ron Adam (December 16, 1933 – October 27, 2014) was a Canadian football quarterback who played seven seasons with the Saskatchewan Roughriders of the Canadian Football League, where he mainly saw action as a defensive back. He played junior football for the Saskatoon Hilltops from 1951 to 1953 as a quarterback, winning a national title with the team in 1953. The Hilltops defeated the Windsor AKO Fratmen 34–6 to win the 1953 junior football national title. Adam was released by the Roughriders in August 1961.

References

External links
Just Sports Stats
Ron Adam trading card
Fanbase profile

2014 deaths
1933 births
Players of Canadian football from Saskatchewan
Canadian football quarterbacks
Canadian football defensive backs
Saskatchewan Roughriders players
Sportspeople from Lloydminster